Pat Kenneally (born 1968) is a former Irish sportsperson.  He played hurling with his local club Newcestown and with the Cork senior inter-county teams in the 1990s.  Kenneally captained Cork in 1995, however, he enjoyed little success with the senior team.  He continued to play with the more junior teams on his club for some years after. He played in four County Finals for his club   He also won the Man of the Match award when playing in the 1994 county success with his division Carbery which allowed him to achieve the honour of captaining his county in the 1995 Senior Hurling campaign.

His inter county career began as a Cork minor hurler in 1986.  He went on to play u21, Junior and Senior hurling as well as Junior football for Cork.  He won an All-Ireland Junior Hurling Championship medal in 1994 and an All-Ireland Junior Football Championship medal in 1989 together with an All-Ireland Under-21 Hurling Championship medal in 1989.  He was also a member of the 1990 senior hurling squad who together with the senior footballers achieved an historic double that year.  In 1993 he won a National Hurling League medal with Cork after the epic three match saga with Wexford. His last medal was one in the Intermediate Football final of 2001 but he retired form the big ball game after the game which benefitted his hurling enormously for the next number of years.

He attended Hamilton High School  in Bandon.  At third level he played both Sigerson Cup and Fitzgibbon Cup hurling with UCC  He had twice broken the same ankle by the age of 17 . He was regarded a hard but fair competitor . He coached St. Brogans College in Bandon to an All-Ireland success in 2004.

After a few years away from the game at a high level (he  played for the 3rds' of Newcestown in 2009 ) he was persuaded to join Valley Rovers.  As a neighbouring parish and a club beset with inner turmoil at the time, many regarded this appointment as a poison chalice.  However they were to win 3 counties within 2 years  (2 football, 1 hurling). In 2010 he was appointed as coach to the Cork Intermediate hurling team.

References

 

1968 births
Living people
Newcestown hurlers
Carbery hurlers
UCC hurlers
UCC Gaelic footballers
Newcestown Gaelic footballers
Cork inter-county hurlers
Cork inter-county Gaelic footballers
Hurling managers